A topic marker is a grammatical particle used to mark the topic of a sentence. It is found in Japanese, Korean, Quechua, Ryukyuan, Imonda and, to a limited extent, Classical Chinese. It often overlaps with the subject of a sentence, causing confusion for learners, as most other languages lack it.  It differs from a subject in that it puts more emphasis on the item and can be used with words in other roles as well.

Korean: 은/는
The topic marker is one of many Korean particles. It comes in two varieties based on its phonetic environment: 은 (eun) is used after words that end in a consonant, and 는 (neun) is used after words that end in a vowel.

Example
In the following example, "school" is the subject, and it is marked as the topic.

Japanese: は
The topic marker is one of many Japanese particles.  It is written with the hiragana は, which is normally pronounced ha, but when used as a particle is pronounced wa. If what is to be the topic would have had が (ga), the subject marker, or を ((w)o), the direct object marker, as its particle, those are replaced by は.  Other particles (for example: に, と, or で) are not replaced, and は is placed after them.

The English phrase "as for" is often used to convey the connotation of は, although in many cases this sounds unnatural when used in English.  It does, however, convey some senses of the particle, one of which is to mark changing topics. If a person were speaking about someone else and then switched to referring to themselves, they should say 私は (watashi wa; "as for me...").  After that, it would not be necessary to mention again that the person is talking about themselves.

Examples
In the following example,  is the subject, and it is marked as the topic. The が that would normally be there to mark the subject has been replaced by は.  The topic normally goes at the beginning of the clause.

In the following example,  is the direct object, and it is marked as the topic. The を that would normally be there to mark the direct object has been replaced by は. As before, the topic goes at the beginning of the clause.

In this third example,  is used adverbially, and it is marked as the topic. Normally there would be no particle marking it as an adverb, and so は is simply added without replacing any particle. The subject, which is omitted, is assumed to be . If it were made explicit, it would be marked by が.  As before, the topic goes at the beginning of the clause.

Okinawan: や
Okinawan uses the topic marker  (ya). If the topic is not a proper noun or ends with a short vowel, it tends to merge creating long vowels such as wan ya to wan nee ("I am").

Example

Classical Chinese: 者
者 (zhě) is used sporadically in Classical Chinese and only when an author wants to emphasize the topic. 者 is usually omitted, unlike in other languages where a topic marker is generally required. Note that although 者 can be used as a suffix attached to a verb or adjective, transforming the verb or adjective into a noun, as a topic marker, its grammatical function is fundamentally different from that of a suffix and therefore cannot be viewed as a suffix.

As an example, consider the sentence "陳勝者，陽城人也" (Chénshèng zhě, yángchéng rén yě), a famous sentence from the Records of the Grand Historian:

Literal translation: Chen Sheng is a Yangcheng person. 
Semantic translation: Chen Sheng is from Yangcheng originally.
Word for word explanation:
陳勝: name of a 3rd-century B.C. rebel.
者: Topic marker.
陽城: name of a town.
人: person.
也: Is. (也 means is, am, or are when used in conjunction with 者; it can mean other things when used independently.)

Note that 者, as well as the sentence of "陳勝者，陽城人也", is romanized here according to modern Mandarin pronunciations. It is unclear how 者 and the entire sentence would have been pronounced 2,000 years ago (and what the proper romanization should have been).

Example 

In modern Chinese, topic markers have been completely lost and are not used anywhere. For example,

Note:  是 can be omitted in some occasions.

Quechua: -qa
The topic marker "-qa" functions as a topic marker and is added after a word.  It is usually followed by the direct object marker "-ta".  Case markers (for example:-pi, -wan, or -man) are not replaced, and can be placed after them. Depending on the conjugation of the verb, it can be omitted as well as the subject

Example
In the following example, Tupaq is the subject, and it is marked as the topic. The topic normally goes at the beginning of the clause.

Mongolian: бол, болбол
The Mongolian language is known to have topic markers. A common one is "бол" (bol; in the traditional script), an abbreviation of "болбол" (bolbol; in the traditional script), but there are a few other words. These words have other uses as well.

See also
Topic-prominent language
Topic (linguistics)
Japanese grammar
Thematic wa
Contrastive wa
Japanese particles
wa

References

 James Clackson (2007) Indo-European linguistics: an introduction
 Ivan G. Iliev (2007) On the Nature of Grammatical Case ... (Case and Vocativeness)

External links
Joshi (Particles) in Japanese – Meguro Language Center
Wiktionary definition of は as a particle

Japanese grammar
Korean language
Syntactic entities